Guru Amonkar was an Indian cricketer who played for Goa.

Amonkar made a single first-class appearance for the team, against Kerala in the 1985-96 Ranji Trophy. He scored 7 runs in the first innings of the match, and 5 runs in the second, as Kerala won the match by a six-wicket margin.

External links
Guru Amonkar at Cricket Archive 

Indian cricketers
Goa cricketers
Living people
Year of birth missing (living people)
Place of birth missing (living people)